The Olivine Ice Plateau is a glacier in the Olivine Wilderness Area and Aspiring National Park in New Zealand's South Island. The plateau is named after the mineral olivine, which is common within the Dun Mountain Ophiolite that underlies the area. The plateau extents to the west over the Forgotten River Col. into the Forgotten River and to the north it merges with the Andy Glacier, which feeds a tributary of the Arawhata River. The Olivine Ice Plateau is one of many glaciers in the region of the Arawhata, Dart / Te Awa Whakatipu, Hollyford / Whakatipu Kā Tuka and Matukituki rivers' headwaters.

The area was explored and mapped in the 1930s by J.T. Holloway. In the 2010s the glacier has retreated, leading to a more rocky approach to the plateau over the Forgotten River Col. The plateau is "revered" by New Zealand trampers for its remote and challenging location.

See also
Glaciers of New Zealand

References

External links
Map of the Olivine Ice Plateau

Glaciers of New Zealand
Landforms of the West Coast, New Zealand
Mount Aspiring National Park